Luca de Samuele Cagnazzi (28 October 1764 – 26 September 1852) was an Italian archdeacon, scientist, mathematician, political economist. He also wrote a book about pedagogy and invented the tonograph.

Life 

Born at Altamura, in what is now Apulia, he taught mathematics and physics in the  University of Altamura under the rectorship of Msgr. Gioacchino de Gemmis. In 1799 he first moved to Florence, where he worked as a teacher and then he moved to the University of Naples Federico II where he became a professor of statistics and of economics, and a member of the Royal Society of Encouragement to Natural Sciences of Naples.

He also became head of the Office of Statistics and Trade of the Kingdom of Naples, under Joachim Murat's rule, and he kept that position until 1821. He was a frequent contributor to the Italian journal Il progresso delle scienze, delle lettere e delle arti, of which he was also editor for a short time. In 1848, at age of 84, he was elected member of the newly born Parliament of the Kingdom of the Two Sicilies; he was involved in the riots of Naples on 15 May 1848 and, because of this, he ended up under trial in Naples. He died in 1852, aged 88, after a trial session.

Honors 
 Knight of Justice of the Sacred Military Constantinian Order of Saint George
 Knight (title held even after 1815 thanks to the Treaty of Casalanza)
 Beneficio semplice of San Vito in Vietri di Potenza
 Knight of the Royal Order of the Two-Sicilies

Academies 
 Member of the Accademia dell'Arcadia, with the title Arcade (1827-?);
 Founding member of the Accademia Pontaniana

Relatives 
 Ippolito de Samuele Cagnazzi - father
 Livia Nesti - mother
 Giuseppe de Samuele Cagnazzi (1763-1837) - brother
 Ippolito de Samuele Cagnazzi - brother
 Elisabetta de Gemmis (?-1799) - sister in law (Giuseppe's wife)
 Maria Elisabetta de Samuele Cagnazzi, nicknamed "Bettina" (1809-1900) - nephew
 Giuseppe Pomarici Santomasi - nephew
 Maria de Samuele Cagnazzi - nephew
 Pietro Martucci - grandnephew (Maria de Samuele Cagnazzi's son)
 Ippolito de Samuele Cagnazzi - nephew

Works 
 Istituzioni di matematica e fisica
 
 
 
 
 
 
 
 
 
 
 
 Sul dissodamento de' pascoli del Tavoliere di Puglia e sull'affrancazione de' suoi canoni, Napoli, Tipografia della Società Filomantica, 1832.
 Tavole di mortalità in Napoli e nelle provincie ... lette ... 1828, 1832.
 
 
 
 , manoscritto conservato presso la biblioteca Archivio Biblioteca Museo Civico (A.B.M.C.) di Altamura
 
 
 
 , contenuto in

Publications 
 
 Memoria sulle curve parallele di Luca Cagnazzi con due lettere dello stesso riguardanti la detta memoria dirette al Signor D. Giuseppe Saverio Poli, scritta tra il 1787 e il 1789, pubblicata dopo il 1794.

Funeral praises

Court cases

Translations of Italian works

Sources
 
 
 
 
 
 
 
 
 
 
 
 
 
 Colaleo, p. 35</ref>

References

See also 

19th-century Italian scientists
19th-century Italian mathematicians
Italian economists
19th-century Italian inventors
1764 births
1852 deaths
People from Altamura
Political economists
Catholic clergy scientists
Academic staff of the University of Altamura
18th-century Italian inventors
Kingdom of the Two Sicilies people